Orotava cribrata is a species of tephritid or fruit flies in the genus Orotava of the family Tephritidae.

Distribution
Canary Islands.

References

Tephritinae
Insects described in 1891
Taxa named by Theodor Becker
Diptera of Europe